Alem is a village in the Dutch province of Gelderland. It is a part of the municipality of Maasdriel, and lies about 10 km north of 's-Hertogenbosch.

It used to part of the province in North Brabant. In 1934, it became part of Gelderland.  Until 1958, Alem, Maren en Kessel was a separate municipality. The villages of Maren and Maren-Kessel are now part of the municipality of Lith.

History 
It was first mentioned in 1107 as Aleym. The etymology is unclear. The village developed along the Maas. The Dutch Reformed Church has probably been built around 1719 using material from a previous church lost in a 1717 flood. In 1840, it was home to 307 people.

In 1925, the canalisation of the Maas resulted in Alem becoming a river island. In 1934, it became part of the province of Gelderland.

Gallery

References

Former municipalities of North Brabant
Populated places in Gelderland
Maasdriel